Marion Zoller (born 8 January 1968) is a retired German swimmer who won a bronze medal medals at the 1991 European Aquatics Championships. She also competed in the 200 m backstroke at the 1992 Summer Olympics, but was eliminated in preliminaries.

Zoller started swimming in a club at age 9. She studied business administration at the University of Tübingen.

References

1968 births
German female swimmers
Swimmers at the 1992 Summer Olympics
Living people
Sportspeople from Munich
University of Tübingen alumni
Olympic swimmers of Germany
European Aquatics Championships medalists in swimming